In the 2003 season, Shelbourne were crowned League of Ireland Premier Division champions.

Personnel

Managerial/backroom staff 

Manager: Pat Fenlon

2003 squad members 

 (Captain)

Results/league tables

League of Ireland Premier Division

Final league table

League Results summary

League Form/Results by Round

UEFA Cup

Qualfying round 

Olimpija Ljubljana won 4 - 2 on aggregate

FAI Cup

Second round

Third round

Replay

League of Ireland Cup

First round

Final group table

2003 season statistics

Player appearances/goals 

As of 28 November 2003.

|}

Top goalscorers

References 

Shelbourne F.C. seasons
Shelbourne
Shel